Argadin is a cyclic peptide natural product, investigated for its ability to be a nanomolar inhibitor of Family-18 Chitinases.

References

Cyclic peptides